Pherbina coryleti is a species of fly in the family Sciomyzidae. It is found in the  Palearctic . The larvae are aquatic and predators of freshwater snails.

References

External links
Images representing Pherbina coryleti at BOLD

Sciomyzidae
Insects described in 1763
Muscomorph flies of Europe
Taxa named by Giovanni Antonio Scopoli